Sidi Mahdi Airport  is an airport serving Touggourt, a city in the Ouargla Province of eastern Algeria.

Airlines and destinations

References

External links 
 
 Google Maps - Sidi Mahdi
 
 

Airports in Algeria
Buildings and structures in Ouargla Province